Argedava (Argedauon, Sargedava, Sargedauon, Zargedava, Zargedauon) was an important Dacian town mentioned in the Decree of Dionysopolis (48 BC), and potentially located at Popești, a district in the town of Mihăilești, Giurgiu County, Muntenia, Romania.

Decree of Dionysopolis 
This decree was written by the citizens of Dionysopolis to Akornion, who traveled far away in a diplomatic mission to meet somebody's father in Argedauon.

The inscription also refers to the Dacian king Burebista, and one interpretation is that Akornion was his chief adviser (literally "first friend") in Dionysopolis. Other sources indicate that Akornion was sent as an ambassador of Burebista to Pompey, to discuss an alliance against Julius Caesar.

This leads to the assumption that the mentioned Argedava was Burebista's capital of the Dacian kingdom. This source unfortunately doesn't mention the location of Argedava and historians opinions are split in two groups.

One school of thought, led by historians Constantin Daicoviciu and Hadrian Daicoviciu, assumes that the inscription talks about Argidava and place the potential capital of Burebista at Vărădia, Caraș-Severin County, Romania. The forms Argidava and Arcidava found in other ancient sources like Ptolemy's Geographia (c. 150 AD) and Tabula Peutingeriana (2nd century AD), clearly place a Dacian town with those names at this geographical location. The site is also close to Sarmizegetusa, a later Dacian capital.

Others, led by historian Vasile Pârvan and professor Radu Vulpe place Argedava at Popești, Giurgiu County, Romania. Arguments include the name connection with the river Argeș, geographical position on a potential road to Dionysopolis which Akornion followed, and most importantly the size of the archaeological discovery at Popești that hints to a royal palace. However no other sources seem to name the dava discovered at Popești, so no exact assumptions can be made about its Dacian name.

It is possible that the two different davae are homonyms.

The marble inscription is damaged in many areas, including right before the word Argedauon, and it is possible the original word could have been Sargedauon or Zargedauon. This form could be linked to Zargidaua mentioned by Ptolemy at a different geographical location. Or, they could be homonyms.

The decree, a fragmentary marble inscription, is located in the National Museum in Sofia.

Literary reference 
 Mihai Eminescu made a reference to Sarmiszegetuza in the "Third Letter Poem" to the hills of Argedava when he described the Battle at the Rovine from 17 May 1395.

See also 
 Argidava
 Dacia
 List of ancient cities in Thrace and Dacia
 Dacian davae

Notes

Sources

External links 

 A fost Argedava (Popesti) resedinta statului geto-dac condus de Burebista? – Article in Informatia de Giurgiu (Romanian)
 Searchable Greek Inscriptions at The Packard Humanities Institute (PHI)  – Argedava segment from Decree of Dionysopolis reviewed in Inscriptiones graecae in Bulgaria repertae by Georgi Mihailov
 Argedava in Enciclopedia Dacica (Romanian)
 Ptolemy's Geography at LacusCurtius – Book III, Chapter 8 Location of Dacia (from the Ninth Map of Europe) (English translation, incomplete)
 Sorin Olteanu's Project: Linguae Thraco-Daco-Moesorum – Toponyms Section

Archaeological sites in Romania
Dacian towns
History of Muntenia
Ruins in Romania